Loot is the second extended play by Australian rock band The Clouds. Released in April 1991, the EP peaked at number 22 on the ARIA charts.

Reception
In The Sell-In, Craig Mathieson said the EP was, "tough, alluring and sexy. The lead cut, Phillis's "Soul Eater", was seditious ear candy and it converted not only Triple J to Clouds but also made inroads at commercial FM stations." He also noted that new guitarist Dave Easton had "hardened up" the band with his aggressive playing.

Track listing

Charts

Release history

References

1991 albums
Indie pop EPs
EPs by Australian artists